The Dora Mavor Moore Award for Outstanding Production of a Play is an annual award celebrating achievements in live Canadian theatre.

Awards and nominations

References

External links
 Toronto Alliance for the Performing Arts - Doras

Dora Mavor Moore Awards